VRT NWS Journaal (formerly Het Journaal) is the main news program of the VRT, broadcast daily on the channels één and Canvas.

The first edition of Het Journaal was broadcast on 31 October 1953, the day that Flemish television began. Initially, Het Journaal was a small operation, with few staff; nowadays, there are dozens of journalists, and many other employees, such as directors, producers and technicians.

Broadcasts
VRT NWS Journaal is typically broadcast four times a day on één: 1pm, 6pm, 7pm, and the late news, which usually airs at around 10:45pm. At weekends, an extra bulletin is broadcast at 8pm on Canvas: this airs in place of current affairs programme Terzake (roughly translated, 'In this respect'). The 7pm edition is the main edition, and the most-watched, usually running for 40 minutes.

Presenters
Current news presenters are:
 Wim De Vilder (since 1999)
 Annelies Van Herck (since 2004)
 Goedele Wachters (since 2007)
 Hanne Decoutere (since 2012)
 Fatma Taspinar (since 2018)
 Xavier Taveirne (since 2018)
 Riadh Bahri (since 2022)

Notable or longtime previous news presenters include Jan Becaus (1985–2013), Ivo Belet (1989–2003), Bavo Claes (1975–2005), Geert van Istendael (1978–1993), Dirk Sterckx (1986–1998), Martine Tanghe (1978-2020) and André Vermeulen (1985–1996).

References

External links
 VRT NWS

Flemish television shows
Belgian television news shows
1953 Belgian television series debuts
Eén original programming
Canvas (TV channel) original programming